Henry Adams (December 24, 1915 – October 28, 2005) was an American football center who played one season with the Chicago Cardinals of the National Football League. He played college football at the University of Pittsburgh and attended California High School in Coal Center, Pennsylvania.

References

External links
Just Sports Stats
 

1915 births
2005 deaths
Players of American football from Pennsylvania
American football centers
Pittsburgh Panthers football players
Chicago Cardinals players
People from California, Pennsylvania